Diabolical Fun is the fourth solo studio album by American rapper Illogic. It was released in 2009. The album was entirely produced by Ill Poetic.

Critical reception
Chet Betz of Cokemachineglow said: "Stellar closing track and a few highlights aside, Diabolical Fun sounds like an artist working just a little too far outside his comfort zone, trying to force his pentagonal peg into a round hole."

Track listing

References

External links
 
 Diabolical Fun at Bandcamp

2009 albums
Illogic albums